Henry Radclyffe or Radcliffe may refer to:

Henry Radclyffe, 2nd Earl of Sussex  (1507 - 1557), son of Robert Radclyffe, 1st Earl of Sussex and Elizabeth Stafford, Countess of Sussex
Henry Radclyffe, 4th Earl of Sussex (c. 1530 – 1593), English peer

See also
Harry Radcliffe